Deal Castle is a defensive artillery fortress in Deal, Kent, England, which was built in 1540 by order of Henry VIII. The successive Captains of Deal Castle originally commanded a garrison based at the fortress, initially from quarters within the keep but later from purpose built quarters in a  block between the keep and the outer wall. The accommodation block was demolished and rebuilt in 1802 and demolished a second time in 1943 following enemy action during the Second World War.

From the early 1700s the post of Captain became an honorary position benefitting from the residential accommodation provided by the castle's living quarters. After the wartime demolition the accommodation was provided elsewhere.

List of captains

References

Honorary titles
Deal